

Goalball at the 2004 Summer Paralympics took place at the Sports Pavilion of the Faliro Coastal Zone Olympic Sports Complex, in Athens, Greece.

Goalball is open to blind and partially sighted competitors, with separate men's and women's competitions.

Men's tournament 

The Men's tournament was won by the team representing .

Results

Preliminaries

Group B

Competition bracket

Classification 5-8

Classification 9-12

Classification 9/10

Classification 11/12

Team Lists

Women's tournament 

The Women's tournament was won by the team representing .

Results

Preliminaries

Competition bracket

Team Lists

References 

2004 Summer Paralympics events
2004
Goalball in Greece